Abram Pease Williams (February 3, 1832 – October 17, 1911) was a teacher, businessman and U.S. Senator from California.

Life
Abram was born in New Portland, Maine on February 3, 1832. He attended the common schools of the time and completed a course of study at North Anson Academy from 1846 to 1848. He taught school at North Anson before moving to Fairfield, Maine, in 1853. There he engaged in the mercantile business. In 1858 Williams moved to California and worked in the mining fields in Tuolumne County. In 1859 he resumed his mercantile pursuits. He then moved to San Francisco in 1861 and became an importer, stock raiser, and farmer. Abram was one of the founders of the San Francisco Board of Trade, serving as its first president. He was also a member of the San Francisco Chamber of Commerce. In 1886 Williams was elected as a Republican to the United States Senate to fill the vacancy caused by the death of John F. Miller and served until March 3, 1887. He did not run for a renomination in 1887. When he returned to California he resumed the wholesale mercantile business in San Francisco, where he died October 17, 1911. He was interred at the Maplewood Cemetery in Fairfield, Maine.

References

1832 births
1911 deaths
Republican Party United States senators from California
California Republicans
American merchants
People from New Portland, Maine
19th-century American politicians
People from Anson, Maine
People from Fairfield, Maine
19th-century American businesspeople